Krunoslav Rendulić (born 26 September 1973) is a Croatian professional football manager and former player who is the manager of Bosnian Premier League club Zrinjski Mostar.

Playing career
Rendulić's professional career spanned over two decades. During this time he mainly played with the clubs in the Croatian First League, with a two-year stint in the Slovenian PrvaLiga with Interblock. In total Rendulić collected over 450 appearances during his career; 368 in thr Croatian top flight which puts him in top 5 of most appearances in the Croatian First League. He finished his professional career at the end of the 2013–14 season, starting his work as a manager. 

During his stints with Hajduk Split, Rijeka and Interblock, Rendulić won the 2000–01 Croatian First League, 2005–06 Croatian Cup, 2007–08 and 2008–09 Slovenian Cups, and the 2008 Slovenian Supercup.

Managerial career
Rendulić started his managerial career in 2014 as an assistant coach under manager Dragan Skočić at Iranian side Foolad. They left club in 2016, while in 2017 Rendulić started to work as assistant coach under the coaching staff of Luka Bonačić at Qatari club Al-Arabi.

Istra 1961 
On 28 October 2018, Rendulić was appointed manager of Prva HNL club Istra 1961, replacing Curro Torres. On 4 March 2019, following a series of poor results, Rendulić terminated his contract with Istra.

Šibenik 
On 20 June 2019, Rendulić became manager of Druga HNL club Šibenik where he played for two years during his club career. 

He made his debut as Šibenik manager in a 3–2 home victory against Hajduk Split II. On 25 September, Šibenik qualified for the quarter-finals of the 2019–20 Croatian Cup defeating Slavonija Požega. On 3 December, Šibenik lost 4–0 to Lokomotiva at home in the cup quarter-finals. 

On 20 May 2020, the Croatian Football Federation canceled the 2019–20 Druga HNL season due to the COVID-19 pandemic in the country and Šibenik was promoted to the highest tier of Croatian football after eight years of playing in the third and second divisions.

A series of four defeats and two draws in six games during the forty days-period in the league, resulted in the dismissal of Rendulić on 23 March 2021.

Gorica
On 30 May 2021, Rendulić joined Gorica as manager. Despite a good start to the 2021–22 season, Rendulić got sacked after poor results in the latter part of the season in March 2022.

Zrinjski Mostar
On 30 November 2022, Rendulić was appointed to replace Sergej Jakirović as manager of Bosnian Premier League club Zrinjski Mostar. In his first game in charge, Zrinjski beat Laktaši in a Bosnian Cup game on 19 February 2023. On 8 March 2023, Rendulić won his first Mostar derby as a manager in a 3–1 victory over rivals Velež.

Career statistics
Source:

Managerial statistics

Honours

Player
Hajduk Split
Prva HNL: 2000–01

Rijeka 
Croatian Cup: 2005–06

Interblock 
Slovenian Cup: 2007–08, 2008–09
Slovenian Supercup: 2008

Manager
Šibenik
Druga HNL: 2019–20

References

External links

Krunoslav Rendulić at FootballDatabase.eu
HNL-statistika.com (in Croatian) 
HRnogomet.com (in Croatian)

1973 births
Living people
Sportspeople from Vinkovci
Association football defenders
Croatian footballers
NK Osijek players
NK Belišće players
HNK Šibenik players
NK Zagreb players
HNK Hajduk Split players
NK Kamen Ingrad players
HNK Rijeka players
NK IB 1975 Ljubljana players
NK Lučko players
NK Vinogradar players
Croatian Football League players
Slovenian PrvaLiga players
Croatian expatriate footballers
Expatriate footballers in Slovenia
Croatian expatriate sportspeople in Slovenia
Croatian football managers
NK Istra 1961 managers
HNK Šibenik managers
HNK Gorica managers
HŠK Zrinjski managers
Croatian Football League managers
Premier League of Bosnia and Herzegovina managers
Croatian expatriate sportspeople in Iran
Croatian expatriate sportspeople in Qatar
Croatian expatriate sportspeople in Bosnia and Herzegovina